Orites myrtoidea , the radal enano, is a shrub species in the family Proteaceae. It is a rare plant which occurs in lava fields in the Andes in Chile. The species  may grow up to 2 metres high, but more often is in the range of 0.5 to 1 metre.  The leaves are about 3 cm long, and 10 mm wide. White to yellowish flowers appear in compact racemes between October and November (mid to late spring) in its native range. These are followed in autumn with reddish brown fruits containing winged seeds.

References

myrtoidea
Flora of Chile
Taxa named by Eduard Friedrich Poeppig